The DS Automobiles Italian Open is the men's national open golf championship of Italy. It was founded in 1925 and, except for 1933 and during World War II, was played annually until 1960. After an eleven-year hiatus, it returned in 1971 when it was one of five tournaments in Continental Europe that were included on the British PGA Order of Merit circuit. The following year of that circuit has since been recognised as the first official season of the European Tour, and the Italian Open is one of few tournaments that have featured on the schedule every year. The 2018 event was the 75th edition of the championship.

In 2017 the European Tour created the Rolex Series, a group of events with higher prize money, with the Italian Open being one of the designated events with total prize money increased to US$7 million, more than double that of the previous year. In 2020 the tournament was not part of the Rolex Series, having been rescheduled with much lower prize money due to the impact of the COVID-19 pandemic.

History
In 1935, British golfer Percy Alliss scored a 262 aggregate on his way to winning the event. He established the lowest 72-hole total ever in any golf tournament ever at the time. The legitimacy of the record was in doubt, according to Time, as the length of the San Remo course was only 5,200 yards, far below the international "championship standard." Many decades later, in 2008, South African Hennie Otto was just one stroke away from Alliss' total, still the tournament record.

Venues

In 1973 the first two rounds were played on two different courses, Acquasanta and Olgiata, everyone playing one round on each course. After the cut, Acquasanta was then used for the final two rounds.

Winners

Source:

Multiple winners
4 wins
 Auguste Boyer: 1926, 1928, 1930, 1931
 Flory Van Donck: 1938, 1947, 1953, 1955
2 wins
 Percy Alliss: 1927, 1935
 Ugo Grappasonni: 1950, 1954
 Sandy Lyle: 1984, 1992
 Sam Torrance: 1987, 1995
 Bernhard Langer: 1983, 1997
 Ian Poulter: 2000, 2002
 Gonzalo Fernández-Castaño: 2007, 2012
 Hennie Otto: 2008, 2014
 Francesco Molinari: 2006, 2016

Notes

References

External links
Coverage on the European Tour's official site

European Tour events
Golf tournaments in Italy
Sport in Turin
Recurring sporting events established in 1925
1925 establishments in Italy